The 1971 Stockholm Open was a men's tennis tournament played on indoor hard courts and part of the 1971 World Championship Tennis circuit and took place at the Kungliga tennishallen in Stockholm, Sweden. The tournament was held from 1 November through 7 November 1971. Arthur Ashe won the singles title and $10,000 first prize money.

Finals

Singles

 Arthur Ashe defeated  Jan Kodeš, 6–1, 3–6, 6–2, 1–6, 6–4

Doubles

 Tom Gorman /  Stan Smith defeated  Arthur Ashe /  Bob Lutz, 6–3, 6–4

References

External links
  
  
 Association of Tennis Professionals (ATP) tournament profile

Stockholm Open
Stockholm Open
1971 World Championship Tennis circuit
Stock
November 1971 sports events in Europe
1970s in Stockholm